Juan Manuel Requena (born 24 January 1999) is an Argentine professional footballer who plays as a midfielder for San Telmo.

Club career
Requena played for the youth systems of All Boys, Rivadavia Arroyo Cabral and, from 2012, Newell's Old Boys. He was moved into the senior set-up by caretaker boss Rubén Rodríguez in December 2018, appearing on the substitutes bench for Primera División fixtures with Patronato and San Martín; though went unused. Héctor Bidoglio, the club's subsequent full-time manager, selected Requena for his professional debut on 15 March 2019 during a defeat away to Gimnasia y Esgrima.

International career
In August 2017, Requena received a call-up to train with Sebastián Beccacece's Argentina U20s.

Career statistics
.

References

External links

1999 births
Living people
Sportspeople from Córdoba Province, Argentina
Argentine footballers
Association football midfielders
Argentine Primera División players
Primera Nacional players
Newell's Old Boys footballers
Club Atlético Brown footballers
Estudiantes de Buenos Aires footballers
San Martín de San Juan footballers
Club y Biblioteca Ramón Santamarina footballers
San Telmo footballers